Regazzoni is a surname. Notable people with the surname include:

 Alberto Regazzoni (born 1983), Swiss footballer
 Carlos Regazzoni (1943–2020), Argentine sculptor
 Clay Regazzoni (1939–2006), Swiss racing driver

See also
 Reguzzoni